Youth Must Have Love is a 1922 American drama film directed by Joseph Franz and written by Dorothy Yost and Paul Schofield. The film stars Shirley Mason, Cecil Van Auker, Wallace MacDonald, Landers Stevens, and Clarence Wilson. The film was released on October 1, 1922, by Fox Film Corporation.

Cast           
Shirley Mason as Della Marvin
Cecil Van Auker as Marvin
Wallace MacDonald as Earl Stannard
Landers Stevens as Frank Hibbard
Clarence Wilson as Austin Hibbard

References

External links
 

1922 films
1920s English-language films
Silent American drama films
1922 drama films
Fox Film films
American silent feature films
American black-and-white films
Films directed by Joseph Franz
1920s American films